Buprestini is a tribe of metallic wood-boring beetles in the family Buprestidae.  There are about eight genera in Buprestini.

Subtribes and genera
subtribe Agaeocerina Nelson, 1982
 Agaeocera Saunders, 1871
 Mixochlorus Waterhouse, 1887
 Peronaemis Waterhouse, 1887
subtribe Buprestina Leach, 1815
 Buprestis Linnaeus, 1758
 Eurythyrea Dejean, 1833
subtribe Lamprocheilina Holyński, 1993
 Lamprocheila Saunders, 1871
subtribe Trachykelina Holyński, 1988
 Sinokele Bílý, 1989
 Trachykele Marseul, 1865

References

 "A catalog and bibliography of the Buprestoidea of America north of Mexico", Nelson et al. 2008. The Coleopterists Society, Special Publication No. 4. 274 pp.
 Bellamy, C. L., and G. H. Nelson / Arnett, Ross H. Jr. et al., eds. (2002). "Family 41. Buprestidae Leach, 1815". American Beetles, vol. 2: Polyphaga: Scarabaeoidea through Curculionoidea, 98-112.
 Bellamy, C.L. (2008-2009). A World Catalogue and Bibliography of the Jewel Beetles (Coleoptera: Buprestoidea), Volumes 1-5. Pensoft Series Faunistica No. 76-80.
 Nelson, Gayle H., George C. Walters Jr., R. Dennis Haines, and Charles L. Bellamy (2008). "A Catalog and Bibliography of the Buprestoidea of America North of Mexico". The Coleopterists' Society, Special Publication, no. 4, iv + 274.

Further reading

 Arnett, R. H. Jr., M. C. Thomas, P. E. Skelley and J. H. Frank. (eds.). (21 June 2002). American Beetles, Volume II: Polyphaga: Scarabaeoidea through Curculionoidea. CRC Press LLC, Boca Raton, Florida .
 Arnett, Ross H. (2000). American Insects: A Handbook of the Insects of America North of Mexico. CRC Press.
 Richard E. White. (1983). Peterson Field Guides: Beetles. Houghton Mifflin Company.

Buprestidae
Beetle tribes